Dead Man's Shoes is a 1940 British drama film directed by Thomas Bentley and starring Leslie Banks, Joan Marion and Wilfrid Lawson. A man who has lost his memory, rises to a position of authority and respect. One day he is confronted by a man who claims to have been involved with him in the past. The film is considered an antecedent of British Film Noir.

Cast
 Leslie Banks as Roger de Vetheuil 
 Joan Marion as Viola de Vetheuil 
 Geoffrey Atkins as Paul de Vetheuil 
 Wilfrid Lawson as Lucien Sarrou 
 Judy Kelly as Michelle Allain 
 Nancy Price as Madame Pelletier 
 Walter Hudd as Gaston Alexandri 
 Peter Bull as Defence Counsel 
 Henry Oscar as President of the Court 
 Ludwig Stössel as Doctor Breithaut 
 Roddy McDowall as Boy

Production
Inspired by the 1938 French film Crossroads, it was made by Associated British Picture Corporation at the company's Elstree Studios. The film was completed in late 1939, but was not released until the following year.

References

Bibliography
Spicer, Andrew. Historical Dictionary of Film Noir. Scarecrow Press, 2010.

External links
 
 

1940 films
1940 drama films
British drama films
1940s English-language films
Films directed by Thomas Bentley
British black-and-white films
Films about amnesia
British remakes of French films
Films shot at Associated British Studios
1940s British films